Hedersleben is a municipality in the district of Harz in Saxony-Anhalt, Germany. It lies on the river Selke, directly upstream of its confluence with the river Bode. The current Mayor is Adolf Speck.

References